Pleasure is the fifth studio album by Canadian singer-songwriter Feist, released on 28 April 2017, through Universal Music Canada. Thematically, the album is said to explore "emotional limits ... loneliness, private ritual, secrets, shame, mounting pressures, disconnect, tenderness, rejection, care and the lack thereof." All of the songs on the album are actually raw takes, as Feist explained on her Twitter: "Our desire was to record that state without guile or go-to's and to pin the songs down with conviction and our straight up human bodies."

Critical reception

Accolades

Semester-end lists

Year-end lists

Track listing
Credits adapted from iTunes.

Personnel
 Feist – vocals, guitars, keyboards, percussion
 Mocky – drums, bass, keyboards, percussion
 Chilly Gonzales – piano
 Lucky Paul Taylor – percussion, programming, drums 
 Jarvis Cocker – oration 
 Choir! Choir! Choir! – cameo 
 Colin Stetson – horns

Charts

References

2017 albums
Feist (singer) albums
Universal Music Canada albums